Catherine McAuley College (formerly Catholic College Bendigo until 2018) is a coeducational Catholic secondary school in Bendigo, Victoria, Australia.

The school has two campuses in Coolock and St Mary's. The Coolock campus is located in the outer Bendigo suburb of Junortoun and provides education for Years 7–9. The St Mary's campus, located in the heart of Bendigo, provides education for Years 10–12, including the Victorian Certificate of Education and Victorian Certificate of Applied Learning.

Catherine McAuley College is governed by the Institute of Sisters of Mercy of Australia and Papua New Guinea.

History

Coolock also changed their homeroom model to a vertical housegroup system. At Coolock, each house now has six Years 10 to 12 housegroups. At La Valla, each house has two Year 7 housegroups, two Year 8 housegroups and two Year 9 housegroups. The total number of housegroups across the college is 64. There are also two further housegroups, bringing the total to 66.  In 2017 the La Valla site changed its homeroom to vertical, so it could bring the Years 7, 8, and 9 together.

2018–present: Catherine McAuley College
In 2018 the college was renamed to Catherine McAuley College after the founder of the Sisters of Mercy, Catherine McAuley. At this time both campuses were also renamed to reflect the history of the Mercy sisters and the college, with La Valla in Junortoun becoming Coolock, reflecting a location where Catherine McAuley undertook work, and Coolock becoming St Mary's, the name of the college prior to 1983.

References

External links 
 Catherine McAuley College official website

Catholic secondary schools in Victoria (Australia)
1876 establishments in Australia
Education in Bendigo
Sisters of Mercy schools
Educational institutions established in 1876